Cuvântul Liber is a newspaper from Leova, the Republic of Moldova, founded by Ion Mititelu in 1998.

See also 
 List of newspapers in Moldova

References

External links 
 cuvantulliber.md

Newspapers established in 1998
Romanian-language newspapers published in Moldova
Newspapers published in Moldova
Leova District
Mass media in Leova